Cristian Caccetta (born 7 August 1986) is an Italian football player who plays for Licata.

Club career
He made his Serie C debut for Foggia on 29 August 2010 in a game against Lucchese.
In October 2014, he was signed by Cosenza after being released by Trapani.

On 29 November 2018, he signed with Sambenedettese.

On 27 July 2019 he signed a one-year contract with Paganese.

On 31 August 2021, he joined Serie D club Licata.

References

External links
 

1986 births
People from Partinico
Living people
Italian footballers
Association football midfielders
Calcio Foggia 1920 players
Trapani Calcio players
Cosenza Calcio players
Catania S.S.D. players
Pordenone Calcio players
A.S. Sambenedettese players
Paganese Calcio 1926 players
S.S.D. Lucchese 1905 players
A.S.D. Licata 1931 players
Serie B players
Serie C players
Serie D players
Footballers from Sicily
Sportspeople from the Province of Palermo